Ruslan Alievich Batyrshin (born February 19, 1975) is a Russian former professional hockey player. He played 2 games in the National Hockey League with the Los Angeles Kings during the 1995–96 season. The rest of his career, which lasted from 1991 to 2005, was mainly spent in Russia. Batyrshin was drafted by the Winnipeg Jets in the 4th round of the 1993 NHL Entry Draft. He is an ethnic Tatar. As a youth, he played in the 1989 Quebec International Pee-Wee Hockey Tournament with a minor ice hockey team from Moscow. His brother, Rafael, also played hockey.

Career statistics

Regular season and playoffs

International

References

External links
 

1975 births
Living people
Anchorage Aces players
Avangard Omsk players
Grand Rapids Griffins players
HC Dynamo Moscow players
HC Sibir Novosibirsk players
Krylya Sovetov Moscow players
Los Angeles Kings players
Phoenix Roadrunners (IHL) players
Russian ice hockey defencemen
Ice hockey people from Moscow
Springfield Falcons players
Tatar people
Tatar people of Russia
Tatar sportspeople
Winnipeg Jets (1979–1996) draft picks